Living Things may refer to:

 Life, all objects that have self-sustaining processes (biology)
 Organisms, contiguous living systems (such as animals, plants, fungi, or micro-organisms)
 Living Things (band), an American alternative rock band
 Living Things (Matthew Sweet album), 2004
 Living Things (Linkin Park album), 2012
 Living Things +, a related DVD by Linkin Park
 Living Things World Tour, a related world tour by Linkin Park

See also 
 Living Thing, an album by Peter Bjorn and John
 "Livin' Thing", a 1976 song written by Jeff Lynne, performed by Electric Light Orchestra (ELO)